Suzette Charles (born Suzette DeGaetano, March 2, 1963) is an American singer, entertainer, and actress. She was Miss New Jersey in 1983, and served as Miss America 1984 for seven weeks after Vanessa L. Williams resigned from the position that July.

Early life
Suzette Charles was born in Philadelphia, Pennsylvania, to Suzette Burroughs, of West Indian heritage and Charles DeGaetano, an Italian American.
She briefly lived in Mays Landing, New Jersey before moving to Philadelphia to enroll in private school.  She attended The Performing Arts School and as a high school graduate was awarded in 1981 a Presidential Scholar in the Arts. President Ronald Reagan awarded her and 141 others the Presidential medallion.
Charles graduated Temple University with a Bachelors of Fine Arts and went on to being named Miss America 1984.

Charles is the second Jewish Miss America since Bess Myerson. 
Charles is divorced and has two children.

Miss America 1984
As Miss New Jersey, she competed in the Miss America 1984 pageant held in Atlantic City on September 17, 1983. Earlier in the week, she had won a Preliminary Talent Award for her performance of "Kiss Me in the Rain". She originally finished as first runner-up. After the reigning Miss America Vanessa Williams was forced to resign that July, Charles replaced her as the new Miss America for the remaining seven weeks.

At the Miss America 2016 pageant, current CEO, Sam Haskell, issued an apology to Williams for "the events of 1984." Charles later commented on the television program Inside Edition that she was perplexed by the apology, suggesting that it was given for the purpose of ratings.

Career

Charles worked in modeling and acting in advertising and educational television and branched out further as a singer and television personality. She acted on the ABC soap opera Loving, CBS television series Frank's Place and performed on This Morning, a British talk show. She hosted a show on Bravo, Arts-Break. She narrated the motion picture Beyond The Dream. She has appeared on stage singing with Stevie Wonder, Alan King, Joel Grey, Sammy Davis Jr., Bill Cosby and Frank Sinatra.

In 1993, Charles was signed to RCA Records and recorded with top British producers Mike Stock and Pete Waterman, releasing her debut single, "Free To Love Again", in August of that year. The single peaked at number 58 on the UK Singles Chart. Other songs she recorded with Stock and Waterman included "After You're Gone", "Don't Stop (All The Love You Can Give)", "Every Time We Touch", "What The Eye Don't See" and "Just For A Minute". Her producers have included Waterman and David Foster who also signed her on his 143 Label. In the late 1980s, Barry Manilow and his management company Stiletto Management represented her on Capitol Records as well.

Personal life
Charles has been a resident of New York City for over 30 years.

She is divorced and is the mother of two.

References

External links

1963 births
Living people
American people of West Indian descent
American people of Italian descent
American women singers
Singers from New Jersey
Miss America 1980s delegates
Miss America winners
People from Hamilton Township, Atlantic County, New Jersey
Miss America Preliminary Talent winners
21st-century American women